Charles Howe may refer to:
 Charles Howe (boxer) (born 1974), American boxer
 Charles Howe (writer) (1661–1742), English devotional writer and courtier
 Charles Moffat Howe (1851–1920), mayor of Passaic, New Jersey
 Charles E. Howe (1846–1911), mayor of Lowell, Massachusetts
 Charles S. Howe (1858-1939), American educator